Old Philadelphians, also called Proper Philadelphians or Perennial Philadelphians, are the First Families of Philadelphia, that class of Pennsylvanians who claim hereditary and cultural descent mainly from England, Wales and Germany, and who founded the city of Philadelphia. They settled the state of Pennsylvania. 

They are considered part of the historic core of the East Coast establishment, along with other wealthy families such as Boston Brahmins of Boston and The Four Hundred of New York City. These families were influential in the development and leadership of arts, culture, science, medicine, law, politics, industry and trade in the United States. They were almost exclusively white Anglo-Saxon Protestants (WASPs), and most belonged to the Episcopal church and Quakerism.

Families
In 1963, Nathaniel Burt, a chronicler of Old Philadelphia, wrote that of Philadelphia's most notable early figures were listed in "the ancient rhyme, rather out-of-date now, called the Philadelphia Rosary," which goes:
Morris, Norris, Rush and Chew,
Drinker, Dallas, Coxe and Pugh,
Wharton, Pepper, Pennypacker,
Willing, Shippen and Markoe.

Burt's full list of prominent families (with those in the poem in italics):

Annenberg, Bacon, Baer, Baird, Ballard, Baltzell, Barrymore, Barton, Bartram,  Berwind, Biddle, Bingham, Binney, Biswanger, Bispham, Bok, Bond, Borie, Bradford, Brinton, Broadbent, Bromley, Brooke, Buckley, Bullitt, Burpee, Cadwalader, Brooke, Cassatt, Castor, Carey Cheston, Chew, Clark, Clothier, Hadley, Coates, Converse, Cope, Coxe, Cramp, Curtis, 

Da Costa, Dallas, De Solis-Cohen, Dickinson, Disston, Dorrance, Drayton, Drexel, Drinker, Duane, Duke, Elkins, Earle, Emlen, Evans, Fisher, Foulke, Fox, Francis, Franks, Furness, Gates, Geyelin, Gowen, 

Gratz, Griffith, Griffitts, Griscom, Gross, Grubb, Hamilton, Hare, Harrison, Hart, Hays, Hazard, Henry, Hopkinson, Horwitz, Houston, Huston, Hutchinson, Ingersoll, Jayne, Jeanes, Jones, Keating, Kelly, Kuhn, 

Landreth, Lea, Lewis, Lippincott, Lloyd, Logan, Lorimer, Lovekin, Lukens, McCall, McKean, McLean, Madeira, Markoe, Matlack, Meade, Meigs, Meredith, Merrick, Meyers, Middleton, Mitchell,  Montgomery, Morgan, Morris, Munson, Newbold, Newhall, Newlin, Norris, Oaks, Oakes

Packard, Patterson, Paul, Peale, Pegg, Penn, Pennypacker, Penrose, Pepper, Peterson, Pew, Platt, Potts, Powel, Price, Pugh, Rawle, Randolph, Read, Redman, Reed, Rhoads, Rittenhouse, Robbins, Roberts, Rosenbach, Rosengarten, Ross, Rush, Sands, Savage, Scattergood, Scott, Scull, Sergeant,

Shelmire, Shippen, Sims, Sinkler, Smith, Stetson, Stockton, Stokes, Stotesbury, Taft, Thayer, Toland, Townsend, Van Leer, Van Pelt, Van Rensselear, Vauclain, Vaux, Wanamaker, Wetherill, Wharton, Whitaker, Widener, Willing, Wistar, Wister, Wolf, Wood, Wright, and Yarnall.

Members of these families are generally known for being fiscally conservative, socially liberal, and well educated. These families often have deeply established traditions in the Quaker and Episcopal faiths. Many Old Philadelphia families intermarried and their descendants summer in Northeast Harbor, Desert Island, Maine. Many of these families trace their ancestries back to the original founders of Philadelphia while others entered into aristocracy during the nineteenth century with their profits from commerce and trade or by marrying into established Old Philadelphia families like the Cadwaladers and Biddles and Pitcairns.  Note the following incomplete history of the Penn-Gaskel Hall's 3 who persist to today (2017) https://www.jstor.org/stable/1914979?seq=1#page_scan_tab_contents

Clubs and societies
Old Philadelphia exclusive clubs and societies
Acorn Club
Athenaeum of Philadelphia
Bachelors Barge Club
Colonial Society of Pennsylvania
Contributionship/Hand-in-Hand
Dancing Assemblies of Philadelphia
First Troop Philadelphia City Cavalry
Germantown Cricket Club
Gulph Mills Golf Club
Merion Cricket Club
Orpheus Club
Numismatic and Antiquarian Society of Philadelphia
Penllyn Club
Philadelphia Charity Ball
The Philadelphia Club
Philadelphia Corinthian Yacht Club
Philadelphia Cricket Club
Pickering Hunt
The Rabbit
Racquet Club of Philadelphia
Radnor Hunt Club
Rittenhouse Club 
Schuylkill Fishing Company
Society of Colonial Wars
Sons of the Revolution
Society of the Sons of St. George of Philadelphia
Undine Barge Club
Union League of Philadelphia 
University Barge Club
Welcome Society of Pennsylvania
Wistar Parties

See also
 Old money
 Philadelphia Main Line
 Boston Brahmins
 Patrician
 Bourgeoisie 
 Bourgeois of Brussels
 Seven Noble Houses of Brussels
 Daig

Notes

References
E. Digby Baltzell, Philadelphia Gentlemen: The Making of a National Upper Class, Free Press, 1958 (reprinted 2004)
E. Digby Baltzell, The Protestant Establishment: Aristocracy & Caste in America, Random House, 1964.
E. Digby Baltzell, The Protestant Establishment Revisited, Transaction Publishers, 1991 (reprinted 2001)
E. Digby Baltzell, Puritan Boston and Quaker Philadelphia, Beacon Press, 1979 (reprinted 2004) 
Nathaniel Burt, The Perennial Philadelphians: The Anatomy of an American Aristocracy, Little, Brown and Company, 1963 (reprinted 1999)

History of Philadelphia
Culture of Philadelphia
Upper class culture in Pennsylvania